Island of Love is a 1963 American comedy film directed by Morton DaCosta and written by David R. Schwartz. The film stars Robert Preston, Tony Randall, Giorgia Moll, Walter Matthau, Betty Bruce and Vassili Lambrinos. The film was released by Warner Bros. on June 12, 1963.

Plot
Steve Blair, always on the lookout for a new money-making scheme, spots a stripper of his acquaintance, Cha Cha Miller, at a Greek restaurant in New York, then overhears her gangster boyfriend Tony Dallas say how somebody should make a wholesome movie about Adam and Eve.

Steve quickly enlists his best friend Paul Ferris to write the script, and together they talk Tony into putting up the $2 million needed to make the film. Tony, backed up by four identically dressed thugs, insists on one condition: Cha Cha has to be cast as Eve.

The film is a disaster. Cha Cha can't act, and no one goes to see it. Tony feels hoodwinked and wants his money back, so Steve and Paul flee to Greece aboard a ship. Once there, another crackpot scam occurs to Steve, turning a small island village known for nothing in particular into an "island of love." He goes to elaborate lengths to fool tourists and natives into believing the island has a rich, romantic history.

Steve falls for a young woman, Elena, he hadn't seen since she was a girl. It turns out she is Tony Dallas's niece, so Steve's in even more hot water when Tony arrives on the island. But as soon as Steve agrees to marry Elena, he is safe from harm from Tony, now about to be a relative.

Cast 
Robert Preston as Steve Blair
Tony Randall as Paul Ferris
Giorgia Moll as Elena Harakas
Walter Matthau as Tony Dallas
Betty Bruce as Cha Cha Miller
Vassili Lambrinos as Professor Georg Pappas
Michael Constantine as Andy 
Oliver Johnson as Professor Krumwitz
Titos Vandis as Father Anaxagoras
Miranta Myrat as Mama Harakas 
Lewis Charles as Louie
Peter Mamakos as Nick
Nick Dimitri as Hood
Tony Rollins as Hood
Victor Lundin as Hood 
Greg Benedict as Hood
Lilian Miniati as Eunice Miranda
Norma Varden as Wife in Nightclub
Sam Harris as Husband in Nightclub

Reception
The film was not well received by critics. As A.H. Weiler wrote in his review for The New York Times, "Most of this business is semi-revived Runyon. These guys and dolls appear to have been around too long." Although director-producer DaCosta and star Preston were coming off the huge success of their previous film, The Music Man, the chilly reception for Island of Love put an abrupt halt to DaCosta's film career, and he returned to the stage.

See also
List of American films of 1963

References

External links 
 
 

1963 films
Films scored by George Duning
Warner Bros. films
American comedy films
1963 comedy films
Films shot in Hydra
Films directed by Morton DaCosta
1960s English-language films
1960s American films